Charles Farrell (6 August 1900 – 27 August 1988) was an Irish stage, film and television actor.

Born 6 August 1900 in Dublin, Ireland, Farrell moved to America and appeared in a stock company in Detroit when a child. In 1921, he moved to England and made his first stage appearance at the Coliseum. His first film appearance was in John Bunny and Flora Finch comedies. Unlike his heroic American namesake, he was (later) cast in villainous film roles. This contrasted with his frequent broadcasts of fairy tales on BBC radio's Children's Hour.

Selected filmography

 The Ring (1927) - Second (uncredited)
 Song of Soho (1930) - Legionnaire
 The Man at Six (1931) - George Wollmer
 The Flying Fool (1931) - Ponder
 Creeping Shadows (1931) - Chicago Joe
 Tonight's the Night: Pass It On (1931) - Williams
 Money for Nothing (1932) - Digger
 The Innocents of Chicago (1932) - Smiler
 The House Opposite (1932) - Wharton
 The Sign of Four (1932) - Funfair Patron (uncredited)
 Jack's the Boy (1932) - Martin
 Looking on the Bright Side (1932) - Tough Man In Street (uncredited)
 Lucky Ladies (1932) - Bookmaker
 Red Wagon (1933) - Milligan
 The Stolen Necklace (1933) - Sailor
 Wild Boy (1934) - Gang Member (uncredited)
 Boys Will Be Boys (1935) - Louis Brown
 Two Hearts in Harmony (1935) - Charles Farrell
 Under Proof (1936) - Spike
 The Amazing Quest of Ernest Bliss (1936) - Scales
 Lonely Road (1936) - Palmer
 Treachery on the High Seas (1936) - Logan
 Jericho (1937) - Sergeant on Guard (uncredited)
 Meet Mr. Penny (1938) - Jackson
 The Rebel Son (1938) - Tovkatch
 Night Journey (1938) - Dave
 Jail Birds (1940) - Spike Nelson
 Convoy (1940) - Walker
 Dangerous Moonlight (1940) - First Cab Driver
 Schweik's New Adventures (1943) - Czech nazi
 Bell-Bottom George (1944) - Jim Bennett
 Meet Sexton Blake (1945) - Skipper
 The Way to the Stars (1945) - American Orderly
 Don Chicago (1945) - Don Dooley
 This Man Is Mine (1946) - Canadian Sergeant (uncredited)
 The Turners of Prospect Road (1947) - Jack
 They Made Me a Fugitive (1947) - Curley
 Boys in Brown (1949) - Mr. Sykes (uncredited)
 Night and the City (1950) - Mickey Beer
 There Is Another Sun (1951) - Simmonds
 Madame Louise (1951) - Felling
 The Crimson Pirate (1952) - Poison Paul
 Miss Robin Hood (1952) - Police Constable (uncredited)
 There Was a Young Lady (1953) - Arthur
 Final Appointment (1954) - Percy
 Out of the Clouds (1955) - Perce (Scarface) (uncredited)
 The Hornet's Nest (1955) - Posh Peterson
 See How They Run (1955) - Basher
 Stolen Assignment (1955) - Percy Simpson
 Morning Call (1957) - John Karver
 The Diplomatic Corpse (1958) - Percy Simpson
 The Sheriff of Fractured Jaw (1958) - Bartender
 Death Over My Shoulder (1958) - Shiv Maitland
 Hidden Homicide (1959) - Mungo Peddy
 Too Young to Love (1960) - Waiting Room Man
 Operation Cupid (1960) - Charlie Stevens
 Surprise Package (1960) - Nick Jamieson (uncredited)
 The Girl Hunters (1963) - Joe Grissi
 Chimes at Midnight (1965)
 Sebastian (1968) - Taxi Driver
 Oh! What a Lovely War (1969) - Policeman (uncredited)
 The Vampire Lovers (1970) - Landlord
 Countess Dracula (1971) - The Seller
 The Abominable Dr. Phibes (1971) - Chauffeur
 Valentino (1977) - Drunk (uncredited) (final film role)

References

External links
 

1900 births
1988 deaths
Irish male stage actors
Irish male film actors
20th-century Irish male actors
Male actors from Dublin (city)